Bharat Aluminium Company Ltd. (BALCO) was an Indian government owned aluminium producer under Ministry of Mines, Government of India. In 2000, the Ministry of Mines, Government of India sold it to Vedanta Resources when Atal Bihari Vajpayee-Bharatiya Janta Party-National Democratic Alliance-led-government was in power. BALCO was incorporated in the year 1965 as a central public sector unit (CPSU) and it was the central government-establishment until 2001, when it was taken over by Vedanta Resources, a company listed on the London Stock Exchange. The government company has been closely associated with the Indian Aluminium Industry, in a pivotal role. Mr. Abhijit Pati is the current CEO & Whole Time Director of the company.

History

It was incorporated in 1965 as a Public Sector Undertaking. It is the first public sector enterprise in India which started producing aluminium in 1974. Till 2001, BALCO was a public sector enterprise owned 100% by Government of India. In 2001, Government of India divested 51% equity and management control in favour of Sterlite Industries India Limited.
There's a little history behind the privatisation of the company that was not doing so well being a public sector company. There were groups formed among people or rather BALCO employees namely supporters of privatisation and the ones who opposed it. Rallies and processions were carried out in the evenings to oppose the privatisation and those who supported it were left in minority. Eventually, things happened as they were planned and the company was listed under Sterlite. There were allegation of scam involved in disinvestment of BALCO.

Achievements
The development of special aluminium alloys for "Intermediate Range Ballistic Missile" – Agni and "Surface Missile" – Prithvi have been significant achievements of BALCO. BALCO has been the first in the Indian Aluminium Industry to produce the Alloy Rods, which is a Feedstock for all Aluminium Alloy Conductors, very much needed for today’s power transmission lines.

Criticism

Safety concerns
A chimney under construction by Gannon Dunkerley & Company at the Balco smelter in Korba, Chhattisgarh collapsed  on 23 September 2009 killing 49 workers.

References

External links

Vedanta Resources
Aluminium companies of India
Companies based in New Delhi
Formerly government-owned companies of India
Indian brands